The World Unseen is a 2007 historical drama film,  written and directed by Shamim Sarif, adapted from her own novel.  The film is set in 1950s Cape Town, South Africa during the beginning of apartheid.  The film stars Lisa Ray and Sheetal Sheth as two Indian South African women who fall in love in a racist, sexist, and homophobic society.

Ray and Sheth also star together in another Shamim Sarif movie, I Can't Think Straight, released in November 2008.

The World Unseen was made with the assistance of the National Film and Video Foundation of South Africa, which took a minority equity stake in the film.

Synopsis
In 1950s South Africa, a land torn apart by apartheid, Amina epitomizes individuality and freedom. She runs the Location Café, a haven of fun, food, and festivities open to all. Amina defines her own laws and lives on her own terms, undeterred by the reproving police and the disparaging Indian community.

Miriam demurely follows conventions and makes no demands on life. Her world is confined to being a doting mother to her three children and a subservient wife to her chauvinistic husband Omar.

Amina has a covert business partner, Jacob, who is barred from owning a business because the State considers him to be 'coloured'. He is attracted to Madeleine, a local white postmistress, but the indignities and injustices of the prevalent law thwart their desire to pursue a relationship.

Omar's sister Rehmat married a white man, against rules that forbid mixed marriages. When she needs protection from police, Amina shelters her, and her charm and strength of character captivate Miriam, who secretly rejoices when Amina accepts a farming job in her backyard.  Amina notices Miriam's inherent kindness and silent dedication, and the mutual attraction between them grows. They bare their hearts to each other and their emotions get entangled. They contrive another reason to meet: driving lessons.

The inescapable social distance between them makes them question their feelings, but,  in the midst of hatred and oppression,  their only refuge is love.

In the resplendent South African landscape, with retro music strewn in the background, The World Unseen explores Miriam's relationship with Amina and how it empowers her to make personal choices that change her world.

Cast
Lisa Ray as Miriam, a wife and mother who has recently immigrated to South Africa.
Sheetal Sheth as Amina, a free spirited café owner.
Parvin Dabas as Omar, Miriam's chauvinistic and frustrated husband and one of the film's primary antagonists.
David Dennis as Jacob, Amina's business partner.
Grethe Fox as Madeleine Smith, Jacob's White love interest who runs the local post office.
Colin Moss as De Witt, a policeman and one of the film's primary antagonists.
Nandana Sen as Rehmat
Natalie Becker as Farah, Omar's lover
Rajesh Gopie as Sadru
Bernard White as Mr. Harjan
Avantika Akerkar as Mrs. Harjan
Amber Rose Revah as Begum
Leonie Casanova as Doris, a waitress at Amina's café shop

Reception

Critics 
The film was positively reviewed by the gay and lesbian media, with AfterEllen calling it "one of the best-conceived queer films of the past year – a sincere, beautifully realized vision of love and resistance in an intolerant world." Rotten Tomatoes gave the film a 30% rotten rating from 27 reviews, with an average score of 4.5/10.

Awards and honours

See also 
 List of LGBT-related films directed by women

References

External links
 

Apartheid films
2007 films
2007 drama films
2000s English-language films
English-language South African films
South African LGBT-related films
Lesbian-related films
British drama films
Films directed by Shamim Sarif
Films shot in South Africa
Films set in South Africa
South African drama films
South African Indian films
2000s British films